The 303d Expeditionary Rescue Squadron is a provisional unit of the United States Air Force. It is permanently deployed to Camp Lemonier, Djibouti.  It was reactivated in 2013 as a forward deployed umbrella organization for rotational Sikorsky HH-60 Pave Hawk and pararescue/Guardian Angel combat search and rescue units of the Air Force Reserve deployed to U.S. Africa Command, specifically to Combined Joint Task Force-Horn of Africa.

From 1997 until 2003, the then-303d Rescue Squadron was a Lockheed HC-130 Combat King squadron, part of the Air Force Reserve Command's 939th Rescue Wing at Portland Air Reserve Station at Portland International Airport, Oregon.  When the 939th transitioned to an air refueling mission with the KC-135 Stratotanker and became the 939th Air Refueling Wing, the 303d was inactivated.  As part of the 2005 Base Realignment and Closure Commission process, the 939 ARW was itself inactivated in June 2008.

Mission
Combat search and rescue, personnel recovery, and aeromedical evacuation capability for USAFRICOM, AFAFRICA and Combined Joint Task Force-Horn of Africa (CJTF-HOA), to include a rescue alert mission, utilizing the HH-60 Pave Hawk helicopter.

History

Reserve rescue mission
The 303d performed search and rescue, as well as aeromedical evacuation missions, in the Southwestern United States and occasionally into Central America from 1956 to 1985.  During this period the squadron also performed escort missions for aircraft deploying to the Pacific.

Airlift
Its mission changed to tactical and theater airlift with the Lockheed C-130 Hercules in 1985, to include also providing aerial fire-fighting utilizing the Modular Airborne Fire Fighting System in support to the U.S. Forest Service in the Western U.S. from 1985 to 1993.

Return to rescue mission
Beginning in 1997, the 303d transitioned back to the HC-130 Hercules and once again trained for combat search and rescue and SAR and helicopter air refueling missions, primarily in the Northwestern United States, augmented by periodic overseas deployments augmenting the regular Air Force.  Members of the 303rd were mobilized and deployed to Italy from May - August 1999 in support of Operation Allied Force.

The 303d was inactivated in 2003 when the 939th Rescue Wing changed missions and became the 939th Air Refueling Wing.

Expeditionary unit
The 303d was reactivated in 2013 as an expeditionary rescue squadron for rotational Air Force Reserve Sikorsky HH-60G Pave Hawk and pararescue/Guardian Angel units deployed to Camp Lemonier, Djibouti in support of Combined Joint Task Force-Horn of Africa (CJTF-HOA).  The squadron replaced Heavy Marine Helicopter Squadron 464 (HMH-464) Detachment A.

Lineage
 Constituted as the 303d Air Rescue Squadron on 1 August 1956
 Activated in the reserve on 8 October 1956
 Redesignated 303d Aerospace Rescue and Recovery Squadron on 18 January 1966
 Redesignated 303d Tactical Airlift Squadron on 1 April 1985
 Redesignated 303d Airlift Squadron on 1 February 1992
 Inactivated on 30 June 1993
 Redesignated 303 Rescue Squadron on 1 April 1997
 Activated in the reserve on 15 April 1997
 Inactivated on 1 April 2003
 Redesignated 303d Expeditionary Rescue Squadron and converted to provisional status on 22 July 2011
 Activated c. 5 February 2013

Assignments
 2347th Air Reserve Flying Center, 8 October 1956
 2350th Air Reserve Flying Center, 1 October 1958
 Fourth Air Force, 8 April 1960
 Sixth Air Force Reserve Region, 1 September 1960
 Western Air Force Reserve Region, 31 December 1969
 403d Aerospace Rescue and Recovery Wing (later 403 Rescue and Weather Reconnaissance Wing), 15 March 1976
 943d Tactical Airlift Group (later 943d Airlift Group), 1 April 1985
 943d Operations Group, 1 August 1992 – 30 June 1993
 939th Operations Group, 15 April 1997 – 1 April 2003
 United States Air Forces in Europe to activate or inactivate at any time on or after 22 July 2011
 449th Air Expeditionary Group, c, 5 February 2013

Stations
 Long Beach Municipal Airport, California, 8 October 1956
 March Air Force Base, California, 1 November 1960 – 30 June 1993
 Portland International Airport (later Portland Air National Guard Base), Oregon, 15 April 1997 – 1 April 2003
 Camp Lemonier, Djibouti, c. 5 February 2013

Aircraft
 Grumman SA-16 Albatross (later HU-16) (1956–1965)
 Boeing HC-97 Stratofreighter (1965–1972)
 Boeing KC-97 Stratotanker (1965–1966)
 Lockheed HC-130 (1972–1985, 1997–2003)
 Lockheed C-130 Hercules (1984–1993)
 Sikorsky HH-60 Pave Hawk (2013–)

References

External links
 
 

303
Air expeditionary squadrons of the United States Air Force
Military units and formations in Oregon